Introduction to Solid State Physics, known colloquially as Kittel, is a classic condensed matter physics textbook written by American physicist Charles Kittel in 1953. The book has been highly influential and has seen widespread adoption; Marvin L. Cohen remarked in 2019 that Kittel's content choices in the original edition played a large role in defining the field of solid-state physics. It was also the first proper textbook covering this new field of physics. The book is published by John Wiley and Sons and, as of 2018, it is in its ninth edition and has been reprinted many times as well as translated into over a dozen languages, including Chinese, French, German, Hungarian, Indonesian, Italian, Japanese, Korean, Malay, Romanian, Russian, Spanish, and Turkish. In some later editions, the eighteenth chapter, titled Nanostructures,  was written by Paul McEuen. Along with its rival Ashcroft and Mermin, the book is considered a standard textbook in condensed matter physics.

Background  
Kittel received his PhD from the University of Wisconsin–Madison in 1941 under his advisor Gregory Breit. Before being promoted to professor of physics at UC Berkeley in 1951, Kittel held several other positions. He worked for the Naval Ordnance Laboratory from 1940 to 1942, was a research physicist in the US Navy until 1945, worked at the Research Laboratory of Electronics at MIT from 1945 to 1947 and at Bell Labs from 1947 to 1951, and was a visiting associate professor at UC Berkeley from 1950 until his promotion.

Henry Ehrenreich has noted that before the first edition of Introduction to Solid State Physics came out in 1953, there were no other textbooks on the subject; rather, the young field's study material was spread across several prominent articles and treatises. The field of solid state physics was very new at the time of writing and was defined by only a few treatises that, in the Ehrenreich's view, expounded rather than explained the topics and were not suitable as textbooks.

Content 
The book covers a wide range of topics in solid state physics, including Bloch's theorem, crystals, magnetism, phonons, Fermi gases, magnetic resonance, and surface physics. The chapters are broken into sections that highlight the topics.

Reception 
Marvin L. Cohen and Morrel H. Cohen, in an obituary for Kittel in 2019, remarked that the original book "was not only the dominant text for teaching in the field, it was on the bookshelf of researchers in academia and industry throughout the world", though they did not provide any time frame on when it may have been surpassed as the dominant text. They also noted that Kittel's content choices played a large role in defining the field of solid-state physics.

The book is a classic textbook in the subject and has seen use as a comparative benchmark in the reviews of other books in condensed matter physics. In a 1969 review of another book, Robert G. Chambers noted that there were not many textbooks covering these topics, as "since 1953, Kittel's classic Introduction to Solid State Physics has dominated the field so effectively that few competitors have appeared", noting that the third edition continues that legacy. Before continuing, the reviewer noted that the book was too long for some uses and that less thorough works would be welcome. 

 Several notable reviews of the first edition were published in 1954, including Arthur James Cochran Wilson, Leslie Fleetwood Bates, and Kenneth Standley, among others.
 Gwyn Owain Jones reviewed the book in 1955.
 The second edition of the book was reviewed by Robert W. Hellwarth in 1957 and Leslie Fleetwood Bates, among others.
 The third edition of the book also received reviews, including one by Donald F. Holcomb.
 A German translation of the book has also received several reviews.

Publication history

Original editions

Reprints

Foreign translations

See also 

 List of textbooks on classical mechanics and quantum mechanics
 List of textbooks in electromagnetism

References

External links 
 
 

1953 non-fiction books
1956 non-fiction books
1967 non-fiction books
1971 non-fiction books
1976 non-fiction books
1986 non-fiction books
1996 non-fiction books
2005 non-fiction books
2018 non-fiction books
Physics textbooks
Condensed matter physics